Alberta Avenue is a pre–World War II neighbourhood in Edmonton, Alberta, Canada.

Alberta Avenue is a mature, inner city neighbourhood in Edmonton, Alberta. Much of the area's development occurred during the First World War era and it was once home to the Great Western Garment Company and the Norwood Foundry.

History
Although it fell on hard times during the 1970s, Alberta Avenue is undergoing revitalization and increasingly is becoming a desirable place to live due to its close proximity to the downtown core, reasonable house prices, and access to amenities such as public transit, the Commonwealth Recreation Centre, the Sprucewood Library and many family owned and bakeries. According to a report by the City of Edmonton's Planning & Development Department, 104 building permits were issued for Alberta Avenue in 2011 with a total construction value of 5,114,708. This was the highest number of permits issued for all the mature neighbourhoods studied. Alberta Avenue was targeted in 2006 for revitalization as part of the Alberta Avenue-Eastwood Business Revitalization Zone.

In 2015, Alberta Avenue was rated #2 area in Edmonton for property investment by Avenue Magazine.

The neighbourhood has an active community league, established in 1922, and a community newspaper, the Rat Creek Press.
Recently, the Rat Creek Press launched the Alberta Avenue History Project to celebrate the rich past of the community. Alberta Avenue is also home to the Carrot Community Coffeehouse, a community gathering place. Much of the revitalization efforts are supported by the non-profit organization, Arts on the Ave and as a result, Alberta Avenue is increasingly becoming a center for Artists and arts activities in Edmonton.  The Nina Haggerty Centre for the Arts is located at 9225 Alberta Avenue (118 ave) and each year the community celebrates the Kaleido Family Arts Festival and the Deep Freeze Winter Festival.

Alberta Avenue is bounded on the north by 122 Avenue (originally called Woodward Avenue), on the west by 97 Street (originally called Namayo Avenue), on the south by 111 Avenue (Norwood Boulevard), and on the east by 89 Street (originally called Fox Street). Historically, only the areas north of 118 Avenue had been known as Alberta Avenue, with the area south of 118th being the separate community league of Norwood, which had also previously joined with the area that makes up present-day McCauley (formerly known as Patricia Square) to form the Norwood-Patricia Square Community League.

Demographics 

As seen in the table below, the demographics of the neighbourhood are changing rapidly.  In 2001, just 4.5% of Alberta Avenue households made $100,000 or more, and by 2010 that number had swelled to 18.0%.  Inversely, in 2001, households generating $49,999 or less accounted for 74.0% of all households, and by 2010, that had shrunk to 46.0%.

Surrounding neighbourhoods 
Surrounding neighbourhoods are Delton to the north and north east, Westwood and Spruce Avenue to the west, Central McDougall to the south west, McCauley to the south and south east, and Eastwood and Parkdale to the east.

Gallery

See also 
 Edmonton Federation of Community Leagues

References

External links 
 Arts on the Avenue
 Alberta Avenue History Project
 Rat Creek Press
 Alberta Avenue Eastwood Area Redevelopment Plan Consolidation (22 MB)
 Sprucewood Library
 Alberta Avenue Community League
 Commonwealth Recreation Centre

Neighbourhoods in Edmonton
Urban decay in Canada